5′-Methylthioadenosine is S-methyl derivative of the adenosine. It is an intermediate in the methylthioadenosine (MTA) cycle, also known as the methionine salvage pathway that is universal to aerobic life.

Formation

The pervasive cofactor S-adenosyl methionine (SAM) is the precursor to 5′-methylthioadenosine. The sulfonium group in SAM can cleave in three ways, one involves loss of CH2CH2CH(NH3+)CO2−, generating the title compound.

History
In 1912, an adenine nucleoside was isolated by Hunter et al. from yeast that were grown without phosphorus or sulfur. Later in 1925, that substance was shown by Levene and Sobotkal to be adenylthiomethylpentose.

In 1936, Nakahara et al. did experiments on rats that suggested that vitamin L2 deficiency inhibits the ability of female rats for lactation. In 1942, they identified vitamin L2 to be adenylthiomethylpentose. Later studies by Folley et al (1942) refuted Nakahara's claims and demonstrated that L2 is not necessary for lactation and thus L2 is  not considered a vitamin today.

Hecht found in 1937 that the body temperature of rabbits, cats and guinea pigs were lowered by 1 to 2 degrees after he gave them adenylthiomethylpentose at a dose of 0.2 g/kg. Kühn et al. replicated this in guinea pigs in 1941.

References

Further reading

  Formerly known as vitamin L2.
  Formerly known as vitamin L1.

Nucleosides
Thioethers